Ensemble neoN is a contemporary classical music ensemble.

History 
The ensemble was founded by Julian Skar and Jan Martin Smørdal in 2008.

Members 
Members include conductor Magnus Loddgard, dancer-soprano Silje Aker Johnsen who was awarded the 2013 Performer of the Year award by the Norwegian Society of Composers, and violinist Karin Hellqvist who was awarded the Interpreter´s prize from the Swedish Society of Composers in January 2016.

Awards 
Ensemble neoN was awarded the Spellemannprisen for their albums The Forester (2013, with Susanna Wallumrød) and Neon (2016). The ensemble was further awarded the 2017 "Performer of the year" award by the Norwegian Society of Composers. They were also awarded the Pauline Hall prize in 2011.

List of recordings
 2013: The Forester (with Susanna)
 2016: Neon
 2019: Through a network of illuminated streets (composed by Martin Rane Bauck)
 2019: Niblock / Lamb (composed by Phill Niblock and Catherine Lamb)

References

External links
 Official site

Contemporary classical music ensembles